There are at least 14 named lakes and reservoirs in Roosevelt County, Montana.

Lakes
 Duck Lake, el. 
 Geddart Lake, el. 
 Horseshoe Lake, el. 
 Johnson Lake, el. 
 Manning Lake, el. 
 McIlwain Lake, el.

Reservoirs
 Bertino Reservoir, el. 
 Crandall Reservoir, el. 
 Harmon Reservoir, el. 
 Homestead Lake, el. 
 Picard Reservoir, el. 
 Shotgun Reservoir, el. 
 Structure Number 139 Reservoir, el. 
 Structure Number 149 Reservoir, el.

See also
 List of lakes in Montana

Notes

Bodies of water of Roosevelt County, Montana
Roosevelt